Edava is a panchayat in Varkala Taluk of
Trivandrum district in the state of Kerala, India. Edava is located 5km north of Varkala, 21km south of port city Kollam and 44km north of capital city Trivandrum. Kappil beach is a famous surf location.Surfsupkerala life saving club operates here.

History 
Edava was the frontier of the erstwhile Province of Travancore: Venad. This village is on the northwest boundary of Thiruvananthapuram district adjacent to the Arabian Sea and situated between two municipalities, Varkala to the south and Paravur to the north. The railway line between Trivandrum and Kollam passes through this village. Edava may be the only village in Kerala with two railway stations: Kappil and Edava. There is a road (TA Majeed Road) connecting Kollam and Thiruvananthapuram.

Edava has witnessed important historical events in Kerala. Historical references show that during the rule of Queen Umayamma one `Mughal Sardar' attacked Venad in the year 1680. His reign extended from the South of Thovala to Edava.

In the year 1726, Queen of Attingal gave permission to the British East Indian Company to build a Pandakasaala (warehouse) near what is now called Vettakkada, close to the Arabian Sea. But even before the setting up of this Pandakasaala, Denmark traders had constructed a trading hub over there. K P Padmanabha Menon, in his seminal work, Kerala History, has quoted English army captain Alexander Hamilton as saying that during the first leg of 18th century: "Here on the beach side, Denmark traders have a small warehouse with coconut-thatched roof. It is in a dilapidated condition. Their trading, likewise, is nominal." This location at Vettakkada is still named Paandiyala, a worn-out usage of Paandakasaala, which is the Malayalam for warehouse.

The first printing press in the erstwhile Travancore, or perhaps in Kerala, with facility to print in Arabic script, was established in Edava in 1936. It was called Coronation Memorial Press and was situated at what is now called Press Mukku. Its establishment coincided with the coronation ceremony of Travancore King. Orders for books, in Arabic, used to come from even far-flung places such as the present-day Pakistan.

Edava is the birthplace of late T A. Majeed, who was the PWD Minister in the first Communist Ministry of 1957. He was known for his impeccable political career minus any blemishes. 

Edava's secular credentials are impeccable and sublime, with Hindus and Muslims living shoulder to shoulder without making any ripples in the placid social waters of this pristine coastal village. There is no wonder because the village is just a microcosm of a larger Kerala. Edavites, cutting across religious affiliations, are used to wake up to devotional songs from temples and call for prayers from mosques. Edavites, cutting across religious belief, enjoy major temple festivals in the village with all fervor and gaiety, without providing any room for nefarious communal elements to disturb this glorious tradition. Of particular mention is the temple festival of Palakkav Temple.

Geography

Demographics
 India census, Edava had a population of 26,903, with 12,292 males and 14,611 females.

Transportation
The main road of Edava is TA Majeed Road, which connects Varkala to Paravur through Edava.

Edava has two railway stations, one is Edavai railway station and the other is Kappil railway station. Edava may be probably the only village in Kerala with two railway stations. The railway line which connects Thiruvananthapuram and Kollam passes through Edava.

The nearest main railway station is Varkala Railway Station which is having stops for almost 90% trains and it is the most important station between Thiruvananthapuram Central railway station and Kollam Junction railway station. Varkala Railway Station is just 3 km away from Edava.

The nearest airport is Thiruvananthapuram International Airport, 55 km from Edava.

Lakes

Edava Nadayara lake and canal

Prominent people
 G. K. Pillai, movie actor
 Thaha, film director
 Arun Gopi, Film Director 
 Balachandra menon, Film actor and director

References

Villages in Thiruvananthapuram district